John Marvin (October 17, 1927 – June 22, 1980) was an American competitive sailor and Olympic medalist. He is a 1949 graduate of the Massachusetts Institute of Technology and won a bronze medal in the Finn class at the 1956 Summer Olympics in Melbourne.

References

External links

1927 births
1980 deaths
American male sailors (sport)
MIT Engineers sailors
Olympic bronze medalists for the United States in sailing
Sailors at the 1956 Summer Olympics – Finn
Sportspeople from Cambridge, Massachusetts
Medalists at the 1956 Summer Olympics